Huntleigh is a city in St. Louis County, Missouri, United States. The population was 334 at the 2010 census.

History
The community, most of which encompasses what was the original  1700s farm of Stephen Maddox, is residential, with no commercial or industrial uses. Police services are provided by the city of Frontenac. Huntleigh was incorporated in 1929 and occupied . In 1927, August Anheuser Busch, Sr. co-founded (with early town resident Edward E. Bakewell, Sr.) the Bridlespur Hunt, a fox hunting club that was based in the community. The hunts now take place in St. Charles County, although some residents still have their stables in the community. Its residents are among the wealthiest people in St. Louis, particularly members of the Busch and Moran families, including August Busch IV.

Geography
Huntleigh is located at  (38.615983, -90.410718).

Demographics

2010 census
As of the census of 2010, there were 334 people, 121 households, and 94 families living in the city. The racial makeup of the city was 91.3% White, 0.9% African American, 2.1% Asian, 2.7% from other races, and 3.0% from two or more races. Hispanic or Latino of any race were 2.1% of the population.

There were 121 households, of which 28.1% had children under the age of 18 living with them, 71.1% were married couples living together, 5.8% had a female householder with no husband present, 0.8% had a male householder with no wife present, and 22.3% were non-families. 19.8% of all households were made up of individuals, and 12.4% had someone living alone who was 65 years of age or older. The average household size was 2.76 and the average family size was 3.22.

The median age in the city was 48 years. 26.9% of residents were under the age of 18; 6.7% were between the ages of 18 and 24; 11.4% were from 25 to 44; 33.6% were from 45 to 64; and 21.6% were 65 years of age or older. The gender makeup of the city was 51.2% male and 48.8% female.

2000 census
As of the census of 2000, there were 323 people, 122 households, and 103 families living in the city. The racial makeup of the city was 99.07% White, and 0.93% from two or more races. Hispanic or Latino of any race were 1.86% of the population.

There were 122 households, out of which 26.2% had children under the age of 18 living with them, 78.7% were married couples living together, 3.3% had a female householder with no husband present, and 14.8% were non-families. 14.8% of all households were made up of individuals, and 9.8% had someone living alone who was 65 years of age or older. The average household size was 2.65 and the average family size was 2.88.

In the city, the population was spread out, with 22.3% under the age of 18, 4.3% from 18 to 24, 17.0% from 25 to 44, 28.5% from 45 to 64, and 27.9% who were 65 years of age or older. The median age was 49 years. For every 100 females, there were 103.1 males. For every 100 females age 18 and over, there were 96.1 males.

The median income for a household in the city was in excess of $200,000, as is the median income for a family. Males had a median income of over $100,000 versus $15,833 for females. The per capita income for the city was $104,420. 1.3% of the population and 2.2% of families were below the poverty line. None of those under the age of 18 and none of those 65 and older were living below the poverty line.

References

Cities in St. Louis County, Missouri
Cities in Missouri
Populated places established in 1929
1929 establishments in Missouri